Elżbieta "Izabela" Dorota Czartoryska (née Flemming; 3 March 1746 – 15 July 1835) was a Polish princess, writer, art collector, and prominent figure in the Polish Enlightenment. She was the wife of Adam Kazimierz Czartoryski and a member of the influential Familia political party. She is also known for having founded Poland's first museum, the Czartoryski Museum, now located in Kraków.

Life

She was the daughter of Count Georg Detlev von Flemming and Princess Antonina Czartoryska.

On 18 November 1761, in Wołczyn, she married Prince Adam Kazimierz Czartoryski, thus becoming a princess.

She was rumored to have had an affair with the Russian ambassador to Poland, Nikolai Vasilyevich Repnin, who was alleged to have fathered her son Adam George Czartoryski.

She had also an affair with the Duke de Lauzun, who says himself in his "Mémoires" he fathered her second son 
Konstanty Adam.

In Paris in 1772, she met Benjamin Franklin, subsequently a leader of the American Revolution, and the French philosophers Jean-Jacques Rousseau and Voltaire, who were bringing new ideas to the old order.

In 1775, together with her husband, Czartoryska completely transformed the Czartoryski Palace at Puławy into an intellectual and political meeting place. Her court was one of the most liberal and progressive in the Commonwealth, although some aspects of her behavior also caused scandals.

Izabela discovered the talent of the young painter Aleksander Orłowski and financed him.

While in Prussia with her daughter Maria Wirtemberska for the latter's marriage, she told Frederick II of her fears that her husband would be poisoned, which was what had caused a split between him and Stanisław August Poniatowski politically. Frederick laughed and told her that only monarchs were poisoned, and spread the conversation around his court to Izabela's detriment, according to Wirydianna Fiszerowa.

In 1784, she joined the Patriotic Party.

After the suppression of the Kościuszko Uprising, her sons Adam George and Konstanty Adam were taken as political hostages by Russia's Empress Catherine II.

In 1796, Izabela ordered the rebuilding of the ruined palace at Puławy and began a museum. Among the first objects to be included were Turkish trophies that had been seized by Polish King Jan III Sobieski's forces at the 1683 Battle of Vienna. Also included were Polish royal treasures and historic Polish family heirlooms. In 1801 Izabela opened the Temple of the Sibyl, also called "The Temple of Memory". It contained objects of sentimental importance pertaining to the glories and miseries of human life. During the November Uprising in 1830, the museum was closed. Izabela's son Adam George Czartoryski, going into exile in Paris, evacuated the museum's surviving objects to the Hôtel Lambert. His son Władysław Czartoryski would reopen the museum in 1878 in Kraków, where it exists today.

Works
 Myśli różne o sposobie zakładania ogrodów (1805)
 Pielgrzym w Dobromilu, czyli nauki wiejskie (ca. 1818)

See also
 Czartoryski Museum
 Royal Casket
 "Mold of the Earth"

References

External links

 Czartoryski Museum website

1746 births
1835 deaths
Writers from Warsaw
Polish people of German descent
18th-century Polish women
18th-century Polish–Lithuanian writers
18th-century Polish–Lithuanian women writers
18th-century philanthropists
19th-century Polish writers
19th-century Polish women writers
Izabella
Izabella
Museum founders
Polish art collectors
Women art collectors
Polish philanthropists
Polish landscape and garden designers
Polish women in politics
Polish writers in French
Polish salon-holders
18th-century Polish nobility
Polish patrons of the arts
18th-century women philanthropists
18th-century women politicians